Grigore Brâncovenu was a Caimacam and ruler of Wallachia in 1818.

Governors of the Ottoman Empire
History of Wallachia (1714–1821)
Ottoman period in Romania